Ellsworth Place is a , six-story, enclosed vertical power center  in downtown Silver Spring, Maryland. It opened as City Place Mall on April 2, 1992, and is located at the intersection of Fenton Street and Colesville Road (U.S. Route 29). Dave and Buster's opened in November 2016.

The shopping center is located in downtown Silver Spring, which underwent densification and renovation from around 2005 through 2020, resulting in a retail, dining and entertainment hub for the Washington metropolitan area.  Ellsworth Place anchors include a two-story Burlington Coat Factory, Dave & Buster's, (as of August 2022) DSW, Five Below, Marshalls, Michaels, Ross Dress for Less and TJ Maxx.  An initial redevelopment in the early 2000s saw the addition of a row of street-level shops, including PNC Bank, MOD Pizza, Chipotle Mexican Grill, and Ben & Jerry's.

History

The building that houses the mall was formerly a Hecht Company department store, the first suburban Washington, D.C., branch of that company, which opened in 1947; the downtown Silver Spring Hecht's closed when the Hecht's at Wheaton Plaza opened in 1987. (The mall is an expansion of the original Hecht's building.) From its start, the mall included "upscale" discount stores, including original tenants Nordstrom Rack and Ross Dress for Less. The mall also included an AMC movie theater on its fifth floor, but it closed shortly after a 20-screen Consolidated Theatres (now Regal Theaters) opened directly across Ellsworth Drive from Ellsworth Place. In 2005 then up-and-coming artist Rihanna performed a free concert at the mall, on a temporary stage built over the center court fountain. The event was sponsored by radio station Hot 99.5, and was in support of her debut album Music of the Sun, with proceeds donated to victims of Hurricane Katrina.

References

External links
Downtown Silver Spring - City Place Mall website (accessed Aug 21, 2008)
Petrie Richardson Ventures - Ellsworth Place website (accessed June 15, 2015)

1992 establishments in Maryland
Downtown Silver Spring, Maryland
Shopping malls in Maryland
Shopping malls in the Washington metropolitan area
Shopping malls established in 1992
Power centers (retail) in the United States